A 2022 Tour Card is needed to compete in Professional Darts Corporation ProTour tournaments.

In total 128 players are granted Tour Cards, which enables them to participate in all Players Championships and European Tour Qualifiers.

Most Tour Cards are valid for 2 years. The top 64 in the PDC Order of Merit all receive Tour Cards automatically, and those who won a two-year card in 2021 still had a valid card for 2022. The top player from the European and UK branches of the 2021 Challenge Tour and Development Tour received cards automatically. The remaining places were awarded at the 2022 Q-Schools, with the final four days of competition awarding two Tour Cards per day from the UK Q-School and one a day from the European Q-School; with the remaining players being ranked and the top players also receiving Tour Cards. All players who won a card at either Q-School had their Order of Merit ranking reset to zero.

Kirk Shepherd and Robert Marijanović resigned their Tour Cards despite having a year left on their Cards, meaning an extra 2 places were made available at Q-School.

Boris Koltsov began competing under a neutral nationality starting at Players Championship 14 on 10 May, following the 2022 Russian invasion of Ukraine.

Tour Cards per Nations

See also
List of darts players
List of darts players who have switched organisation

References 
 

2022 PDC Pro Tour
2022 in darts
Lists of darts players